Ventilation shutdown (VSD) is a means to kill livestock by suffocation and heat stroke in which airways to the building in which the livestock are kept are cut off. It is used for mass killing — usually to prevent the spread of diseases such as avian influenza. Animal rights organizations have called the practice unethical. The addition of carbon dioxide or additional heat to the enclosure is known as ventilation shutdown plus (VSD+).

History 
The term ventilation shutdown appears to have originated in 2006 from the United Kingdom Department for Environment, Food and Rural Affairs. The practice was first permitted in the UK on the April 29th, 2006. In the United States, approval to use ventilation shutdown was given in 2015.

In 2020, supply chain disruptions from the COVID-19 pandemic led to many meat plant closures and in turn backup in slaughtering. In response, millions of US farm animals were killed via mass depopulation methods with ventilation shutdown often being chosen.

The ongoing 2020-2022 H5N8 avian influenza outbreak has led to millions of birds being killed via ventilation shutdown. In March 2022, one of the world's largest egg farms, Rembrandt Enterprises, used ventilation shutdown to kill 5.3 million chickens after the appearance of an avian influenza case.

Controversy 
The practice of ventilation shutdown has been called cruel by many animal welfare and animal right groups such as the Humane Society of the United States. The process takes hours of high heat with one study putting the number between 1.5-3.75 hours for the egg industry. Environmental temperatures as high as 170 F have been recorded in facilities where VSD has been used. In known recordings of the practice for pigs, sustained screaming and signs of distress were observed. 

The widespread use of VSD is attributable by many to the American Veterinary Medical Association (AVMA) publicly classifying ventilation shutdown's use as "acceptable under constrained circumstances."  This rating allows pork and poultry producers to be indemnified by the US government for the destruction of their herds and flocks using VSD.  Were the practice not considered acceptable by the AVMA, no indemnities would be paid and there would be tremendous economic pressure on producers to employ more humane methods of depopulating their stock. An association known as Veterinarians Against Ventilation Shutdown has campaigned vigorously to get VSD reclassified as "not recommended" by the AVMA but so far to negligible effect.   
Close ties between the AVMA and large agribusiness corporations have been cited as a likely reason for the AVMA's recalcitrance.

References

Livestock
Ethically disputed business practices towards animals
Animal culling